Hrudaya Kaleyam is a 2014 Telugu-language parody film directed by Steven Shankar. It stars debutant Adarsh Mandadi in the lead role.

The film revolves around Sampoornesh Babu, a petty thief who robs parts in electronic shops and why he robs electronic shops and departmental stores. The movie was considered a hit at the box office. Since the budget was very low of 1.5 crores, this movie is considered to be one of the highest-grossing low budget movies by getting 4 Crores. The film released with low expectations on 4 April 2014 in theaters. Upon release, the film received largely positive reviews from critics and audience.

Plot

Cast 
 Anirvedh as Sampo
 Swasthu as Swaasa 
 Kirru as Neelu 
 Kathi Mahesh as Bhairav Rathode
 Jain Charan Musturu as Ram Vallabhaneni 
 Spot babu  as Pranav 
 Swastika as Black Mamba

Soundtrack 

Music:  RK, Spot Babu
Lyrics:  Spot Babu, Junaid Babu, Akhila, Jain Babu

Nene Baby Shampoo sung by Spot Babu
Enduku naku ee jeevitham (Male) sung by Junaid Kanti's son (Singer)
Pitthey vesina bedaradu sung by Junaid Babu
Meki maki maki meki (Classical) sung by Jain Babu
Hrudaya Vinuve (Fast Beat) sung by Ravindra Tejaswi
Ekkadiki ravalo cheppu (Female) sung by Mundamopi
Naku Shivarathri sung by Geetha Madhuri, Rahul Sipligunj

Reception 

The film received positive reviews from critics. The Hindu gave a review stating "While the audience laughs and claps at the spoof, the movie disappoints in the acting skills. The audience seemed oblivious to it though. All actors appear very raw. Some scenes looked straight out of a low budget slow Telugu TV serial. The director seems to have handled the situation well, with one after another clichéd scenes coming with a pun. The director has smartly avoided making the movie a spoof to belittle the Telugu movie industry and larger-than-life heroes. It’s just a fun take on typical masala movies."

References

External links
 

2014 films
2010s Telugu-language films
Indian parody films